William Andre (August 23, 1931 – October 17, 2019), commonly known as "Bill", was an American fencer and modern pentathlete. Born in Montclair, New Jersey, he won an individual bronze medal at the 1953 world championships. While a lieutenant in the US Navy, he was selected as part of the US team for the 1956 Summer Olympics, at which the team won a silver medal. He finished seventh in the individual event. In the same year, he finished second in the épée at the AFLA national fencing championships.

References

1931 births
2019 deaths
American male modern pentathletes
Modern pentathletes at the 1956 Summer Olympics
Olympic silver medalists for the United States in modern pentathlon
People from Montclair, New Jersey
Sportspeople from Essex County, New Jersey
Medalists at the 1956 Summer Olympics
Pan American Games silver medalists for the United States
Pan American Games medalists in modern pentathlon
Modern pentathletes at the 1955 Pan American Games
Medalists at the 1955 Pan American Games
20th-century American people